"Take Me Home" is a 1987 single by Roger Daltrey, who at the time was the singer for The Who. The song is an adaptation of "Cargo", recorded by French singer Axel Bauer, written by Bauer with Michel Eli.

Daltrey's recording, with English lyrics, was credited to Bauer, Eli, Daltrey and Nigel Hinton.  It was released on his 1987 solo album Can't Wait to See the Movie.   The single failed to chart in the UK but reached and peaked at number 46 on Billboard's Mainstream Rock Chart.

References

1987 singles
1987 songs
Songs written by Roger Daltrey